Chitbara Gaon is a town and a nagar panchayat of Ballia district, Uttar Pradesh, India.

Demographics
 India census, Chitbara Gaon had a population of 21,879. Males constitute 52% of the population and females 48%. Chitbara Gaon has an average literacy rate of 31%, lower than the national average of 79.9%; with male literacy of 42% and female literacy of 18%.  10% of the population is under 6 years of age.

Tourism 

Baraiya Pokhara, Chitbara Gaon
Ramshala, Chitbara Gaon
 Shivala, Chitbara Gaon
 Bhawani Sthan, Jawahar Nagar,
 Madari Peer Baba, Railway Station
 Hanuman Tempal Mahrew Road
 Surahi ke Taal.
 Teliya Pokhra . Shiv mandir
  Main market chitbara gaon

Notable People 

 Prasiddha Narayan Singh, Bhojpuri Poet and Freedom Fighter

References

Cities and towns in Ballia district